Arturo Sandoval is a Cuban-American jazz trumpeter, pianist, timbalero, and composer. While living in his native Cuba, Sandoval was influenced by jazz musicians Charlie Parker, Clifford Brown, and Dizzy Gillespie. In 1977 he met Gillespie, who became his friend and mentor and helped him defect from Cuba while on tour with the United Nations Orchestra. Sandoval became an American naturalized citizen in 1998. His life was the subject of the film For Love or Country: The Arturo Sandoval Story (2000) starring Andy García.

Sandoval has won 4 Grammy Awards, Billboard Awards and one Emmy Award. He performed at the White House and at the Super Bowl (1995)

Life and career

Sandoval was born in Artemisa. As a twelve-year-old boy in Cuba, he played trumpet with street musicians. He helped establish the Orquesta Cubana de Musica Moderna, which became the band Irakere in 1973. He toured worldwide with his own group in 1981. During the following year he toured with Dizzy Gillespie, who became his friend and mentor. From 1982 to 1984, he was voted Cuba's Best Instrumentalist and was a guest artist at the BBC and Leningrad Symphony Orchestras.

In 1989, Gillespie invited Sandoval to be part of the United Nations Orchestra. During a tour with this group, Sandoval visited the American Embassy in Athens, Greece, accompanied by Gillespie who helped him with his plan to defect from Cuba. He became an American citizen on December 7, 1998.

Sandoval has performed Latin jazz with Paquito D'Rivera, Tito Puente, and Chico O'Farrill, Cuban music in Miami, and classical music in England and Germany. In the 1990s, he was a member of the GRP All-Star Big Band.

In 2014, Sandoval performed at Eastman Theatre with Zane Musa, Dave Siegel, Teymur Phel, Johnny Friday, and Armando Arce.

He has taught at Florida International University and Whitworth University, where he is in charge of its jazz ensemble. He has performed with Los Angeles Philharmonic, Pittsburgh Symphony and National Symphony Orchestras. In 1996, Sandoval was commissioned by the Kennedy Center Ballet to score Pepito's Story, a ballet based on the book by Eugene Fern and choreographed by Debbie Allen. Sandoval also composed a classical trumpet concerto that he performed and recorded with the London Symphony Orchestra.

Awards and honors
Sandoval's score for a film about his life won an Emmy Award. His compositions and performances can be heard on The Mambo Kings, which was nominated for a Grammy Award in 1992 for Best Instrumental Composition Written for a Motion Picture or for Television.

His song "A Mis Abuelos" (To My Grandparents) received Grammy Award nominations for Best Instrumental Composition and Best Arrangement. This composition appeared on his Grammy-winning album Danzon.

On November 20, 2013, President Barack Obama presented Sandoval with the Presidential Medal of Freedom.

Other work
In 2015, Arturo Sandoval joined the 14th annual Independent Music Awards judging panel to assist independent musicians' careers. He was also a judge for the 10th, 12th and 13th Independent Music Awards.

Discography

As leader
 Turi (Areito, 1981)
 Arturo Sandoval y Su Grupo (Areito, 1982)
 To a Finland Station with Dizzy Gillespie (Pablo, 1982)
 Breaking the Sound Barrier (Chicago Caribbean, 1983)
 Tumbaito (Messidor, 1986)
 No Problem (Jazz House, 1987)
 Straight Ahead (Jazz House, 1988)
 Plays for the Pandas (Cocoral, 1988)
 Just Music (Jazz House, 1989)
 Arturo Sandoval (Areito, 1991)
 Flight to Freedom (GRP, 1991)
 I Remember Clifford (GRP, 1992)
 Dream Come True (GRP, 1993)
 Danzón (GRP, 1994)
 The Classical Album (RCA Victor, 1994)
 Arturo Sandoval & the Latin Train (GRP, 1995)
 Swingin'(GRP, 1996) 
 Hot House (N-Coded, 1998)
 Americana (N-Coded, 1999)
 Los Elefantes with Wynton Marsalis (In-akustik, 1999)
 For Love or Country: The Arturo Sandoval Story (Atlantic, 2000)
 Jam Miami (Concord, 2000)
 Ronnie Scott's Jazz House (DCC, 2000)
 L. A. Meetings (CuBop, 2001)
 My Passion for the Piano (Columbia, 2002)
 Trumpet Evolution (Columbia, 2003)
 Live at the Blue Note (Half Note, 2005)
 Rumba Palace (Telarc, 2007)
 Mambo Nights (2009)
 A Time for Love (Concord Jazz, 2010)
 Dear Diz (Every Day I Think of You) (Concord Jazz, 2012)
 At Middleton (Perserverance, 2014)
 Live at Yoshi's (Alfi, 2015)
 Ultimate Duets (Universal, 2018)
 Christmas at Notre Dame (2018)
 Rhythm & Soul (MetaJAX, 2022)

As sideman
With Willy Chirino
 Oxigeno (Sony, 1991)
 South Beach (Sony, 1993)
 Cuba Libre (Sony, 1998)

With Ed Calle
 DoubleTalk (Columbia, 1996)
 Sunset Harbor (Concord 1999)
 Twilight (Concord, 2001)
 360 (Mojito, 2016)

With the GRP All-Star Big Band
 GRP All-Star Big Band (GRP, 1992)
 Dave Grusin Presents GRP All-Star Big Band Live! (GRP, 1993)
 All Blues (GRP, 1995)

With Dave Grusin
 Havana (GRP, 1990)
 The Orchestral Album (GRP, 1994)
 Random Hearts (Sony, 1999)
 An Evening with Dave Grusin (Heads Up, 2011)

With Irakere
 3 1/2 (BASF, 1976)
 Chekere Cuba (Love 1977)
 Irakere (Areito, 1978)
 Chekere Son (JVC, 1979)
 2 (Columbia, 1979)
 Cuba Libre (JVC, 1980)
 Live in Sweden (A Disc, 1981)
 El Coco (JVC, 1982)

With others
 Albita, Dicen Que... (Epic, 1996)
 David Amram, Havana/New York (Flying Fish, 1978)
 Paul Anka, Amigos (Columbia, 1996)
 Paul Anka, A Body of Work (Epic, 1998)
 Ricardo Arjona, Galeria Caribe (Epic, 2000)
 Luis Eduardo Aute, 20 Canciones De Amor y Un Poema Desesperado (Ariola, 1986)
 Regina Belle, Passion (Columbia, 1992)
 Eric Benet, Eric Benet (BMG, 2016)
 Tony Bennett, Duets II (Columbia, 2011)
 Canadian Brass, Noel (RCA Victor, 1994)
 Vikki Carr, Memories, Memorias (Universal, 1999)
 Dr. John, Ske-Dat-De-Dat (Concord, 2014)
 Paquito D'Rivera, Reunion (L'Escalier 1991)
 Candy Dulfer, What Does It Take (N-Coded, 1999)
 Gloria Estefan, Into the Light (Epic, 1991)
 Gloria Estefan, Mi Tierra (Epic, 1993)
 Kurt Elling, Passion World (Concord Jazz, 2015)
 Pete Escovedo, Live from Stern Grove (Concord Jazz, 2013)
 Alejandro Fernandez, Confidencias (Universal, 2013)
 Kenny G, At Last... the Duets Album (Arista, 2004)
 David Garrett, Music (Decca, 2012)
 Lucho Gatica, Historia De Un Amor (Universal, 2013)
 Dizzy Gillespie, Gillespie en Vivo (Areito, 1985)
 Dizzy Gillespie, Live at the Royal Festival Hall (Enja, 1990)
 Josh Groban, All That Echoes (Reprise, 2013)
 Ruben Gonzalez, Suena El Piano Ruben Grandes Solos (Egrem, 2009)
 Gordon Goodwin, Swingin' for the Fences (Silverline, 2000)
 George Gruntz, Sins'n Wins'n Funs (TCB, 1996)
 Henri Guedon, Afro Temple (Le Chant Du Monde, 1984)
 David Hickman, Trumpet Fiesta (Summit, 2011)
 Alicia Keys, The Diary of Alicia Keys (J 2004)
 Michel Legrand, Michel Plays Legrand (LaserLight, 1994)
 Beenie Man, Art and Life (Virgin, 2000)
 Junior Mance, ManceSolid, (Chiaroscuro, 2018)
 Martika, Martika's Kitchen (Columbia, 1991)
 Ricky Martin, Sound Loaded (Columbia, 2000)
 Johnny Mathis, How Do You Keep the Music Playing? (Columbia, 1993)
 Luis Miguel, Mis Romances (WEA, 2001)
 T. S. Monk, Monk On Monk (N2K Encoded, 1997)
 James Moody, Moody's Party (Telarc, 1995)
 Azucar Moreno, Esclava de tu Piel (Epic, 1996)
 Azucar Moreno, Ole (Epic, 1998)
 Mouskouri, Nana Latina (Mercury, 1996)
 Alphonse Mouzon, Angel Face (Tenacious, 2011)
 Billie Myers, Growing Pains (Universal, 1997)
 Chico O'Farrill, Heart of a Legend (Milestone, 1999)
 Ole Ole, Al Descubierto (Hispavox, 1992)
 Johnny Pacheco, Entre Amigos (Bronco, 2005)
 Jorge Luis Prats, Toot Suite (Areito, 1986)
 The Rippingtons, Black Diamond (Windham Hill/Peak, 1997)
 Danny Rivera, Tiempo Al Tiempo (Columbia, 1992)
 Lourdes Robles, Amaneciendo En Ti (Sony, 1993)
 Alejandro Sanz, Sirope (Universal, 2015)
 Alfredo Sadel, Alfredo Sadel En Cuba (BASF, 1978)
 Poncho Sanchez, Psychedelic Blues (Concord, 2009)
 Gilberto Santa Rosa, A Dos Tiempos De Un Tiempo (Sony, 1992)
 Jimmy Scott, I Go Back Home (Eden River, 2016)
 Jon Secada, Si Te Vas (SBK, 1994)
 Jon Secada, Secada (SBK, 1997)
 Alan Silvestri, Clean Slate (Perez Family Music Box 2013)
 Frank Sinatra, Duets (Capitol, 2013)
 Rod Stewart, As Time Goes By (J/BMG, 2003)
 Rod Stewart, It Had to Be You (J/BMG, 2002)
 Billy Taylor, Taylor Made at the Kennedy Center (Kennedy Center, 2005)
 Diego Torres, Tal Cual Es (BMG, 1999)
 Juan Pablo Torres, Pepper Trombone (RMM/TropiJazz, 1997)
 Juan Pablo Torres, Together Again (Pimenta 2002)
 Dave Valentin, Red Sun (GRP, 1993)
 Chris Walden, Full-On! (Origin, 2014)
 Ernie Watts, Reaching Up (JVC, 1994)
 Randy Waldman, Wigged Out (Whirlybird, 1998)
 Randy Waldman, Super Heroes (BFM, 2018)

Filmography
1987: A Night in Havana: Dizzy Gillespie in Cuba
1990: Dizzy Gillespie and the United Nations Orchestra
1993: GRP All-Star Big Band Live
1995: Lava Lava!
1996: Mr. Wrong
1996: The Perez Family
2000: For Love or Country: The Arturo Sandoval Story
2000: Knockout
2001: 61*
2010: Sacred Waters
2011: Oscar's Cuba
2013: 1000 to 1
2013: Antebellum
2013: At Middleton
2013: Christmas in Conway
2013: The Resurrection of Malchus
2013: Tightwire
2015: Underdog Kids
2018: The Mule
2019: Richard Jewell

References

External links

 
Arturo Sandoval, "A Time for Love" by Billboard
Arturo Sandoval Interview NAMM Oral History Program, July 26, 2011
Arturo Sandoval Clinic

1949 births
Living people
21st-century trumpeters
American Book Award winners
Cuban emigrants to the United States
Cuban jazz trumpeters
Florida International University faculty
Grammy Award winners
GRP All-Star Big Band members
GRP Records artists
Irakere members
Latin Grammy Award winners
Latin jazz trumpeters
Presidential Medal of Freedom recipients
Ubiquity Records artists
Whitworth University faculty